The Master of the Darup Altarpiece, sometimes called the Master of Darup, was an anonymous German painter active in Westphalia around 1430.  His work is influenced by that of Conrad von Soest; his name is derived from the altarpiece in the parish church of Darup, whose central panel, a Crucifixion, uses delicate colors which appear to have been influenced by French miniature painting.

Darup Altarpiece, Master of the
15th-century German painters